The 2012–13 BYU Cougars men's basketball team represented Brigham Young University during the 2012–13 NCAA Division I men's basketball season. It was head coach Dave Rose's eighth season at BYU and the Cougars second season in the West Coast Conference. The Cougars played their home games at the Marriott Center. The Cougars finished the regular season at 21–11, good for third place in the WCC. The Cougars accepted an invitation to the NIT, where they lost in the semifinals to eventual champion Baylor. The Cougars finished with an overall record of 24–12, one win away from what would have been a seventh consecutive 25-win season.

Before the season

Departures

Recruiting
Through the course of the fall and spring letter of intent days, the Cougars would bolster their lineup. On November 11, Coach Rose announced that Cory Calvert and Jordan Chatman had signed letters of intent to play for BYU. He revealed then that both Calvert and Chatman planned to serve church missions before joining the team, meaning they wouldn't become part of the BYU team until the 2014–15 season. Freshman Cooper Ainge, son of former BYU great Danny Ainge, announced he would walk-on at BYU. He plans to play for 1 year before departing on a mission. The spring national Letter of Intent Signing Days began on April 10, 2012 and ran through May 16. On the first day of eligibility, Raúl Delgado and Agustín Ambrosino signed letters of intent. Both will come in as juniors and have two years of eligibility.  On April 20, it was announced that Cory Calvert would play one season before going on his mission, just as Ainge is doing, because he wouldn't have time to get into playing shape for the 2014–15 season after his mission.

2012–13 Return Missionaries
BYU would also get a boost from 2 return missionaries in the form of Tyler Haws and Kyle Rose. Haws would return to BYU on April 18, 2012 to get ready to play. In Haws first season at BYU (2009–10), Haws would average 11.3 points and 4.2 rebounds a game while helping BYU to a 30–6 record. Rose is the nephew of head coach Dave Rose and will be playing his first regular season for BYU after redshirting the 2009-10 season.

2012–13 media

Television information
On the April 30 episode of True Blue, it was announced that fall practice would begin October 12. The Blue-White Scrimmage took place on October 24, and the Cougars had their first scrimmage on October 26. BYUtvsports.com and BYUtv provided coverage of the inter-squad match and the scrimmages. All home games and conference road games aired on BYUtv or on ESPN, ESPN2, ESPNU, or ROOT.

Media Day
BYU Basketball Media Day was held Wednesday, August 10 from 8:30 AM– 2:30 PM. Jarom Jordan recapped the 2011-12 season and then interviewed every player on the 2012-13 BYU Basketball roster. The day ended with a Dave Rose press conference and then player interviews with various media organizations.

It was also announced on Media Day that BYUtv Sports would carry all home broadcasts that ESPN had not picked up while BYUtvsports.com would exclusively carry the 2012 Cougar Classic.

BYU Radio Sports Network Affiliates

KSL 102.7 FM and 1160 AM- Flagship Station (Salt Lake City/ Provo, UT and ksl.com)
BYU Radio- Nationwide (Dish Network 980, Sirius XM 143, and byuradio.org)
KTHK- Blackfoot/ Idaho Falls/ Pocatello/ Rexburg, ID
KMGR- Manti, UT
KSUB- Cedar City, UT
KDXU- St. George, UT

Roster

Schedule

|-
!colspan=8 style="background:#FFFFFF; color:#002654;"| Exhibition

|-
!colspan=8 style="background:#002654; color:#FFFFFF;"| Regular Season

|-
!colspan=8 style="background:#FFFFFF; color:#002654;"| 2013 West Coast Conference men's basketball tournament

|-
!colspan=8 style="background:#FFFFFF; color:#002654;"| 2013 National Invitation Tournament

Game Summaries

Cougar Tipoff
Broadcasters: Robbie Bullough, Steve Cleveland, and Shaun Gordon

Exhibition: Southeastern Oklahoma State
Broadcasters: Dave McCann, Blaine Fowler, and Kory Aldous

Exhibition: Findlay
Broadcasters: Dave McCann, Steve Cleveland, and Robbie Bullough

Coaches vs. Cancer Classic: Tennessee State
Series History: First Meeting
Broadcasters: Dave McCann, Steve Cleveland, and Robbie Bullough

Coaches vs. Cancer Classic: Georgia State
Series History: First Meeting
Broadcasters: Dave McCann, Blaine Fowler, and Robbie Bullough

Coaches vs. Cancer Classic: Florida State
Series History: BYU leads series 1-0
Broadcasters: Brian Anderson, Greg Anthony, Steve Smith, Craig Sager, and Seth Davis

Coaches vs. Cancer Classic: #20 Notre Dame
Series History: Notre Dame leads series 4-3
Broadcasters: Brian Anderson, Greg Anthony, Steve Smith, Craig Sager, and Seth Davis

Texas-San Antonio
Series History: First Meeting 
Broadcasters: Dave McCann, Blaine Fowler, and Robbie Bullough

Cal State Northridge
Series History: BYU leads series 4-0  
Broadcasters: Dave McCann, Blaine Fowler, and Robbie Bullough

Montana
Series History: BYU leads series 23-10  
Broadcasters: Dave McCann, Blaine Fowler, and Robbie Bullough

at Iowa State
Series History: Iowa State leads series 4-0  
Broadcasters: John Walters and Eric Heft

Utah
Series History: BYU leads series 128-125  
Broadcasters: Dave McCann, Steve Cleveland, and Robbie Bullough

at Weber State
Series History: BYU leads series 27-10  
Broadcasters: Dave McCann, Blaine Fowler, and Robbie Bullough (Jarom Jordan and Steve Cleveland Halftime)

Eastern New Mexico
Series History: BYU leads series 1-0  
Broadcasters: Dave McCann, Steve Cleveland, and Robbie Bullough

at Baylor
Series History: BYU leads series 5-3
Broadcasters: Mark Neely and Bruce Pearl

Northern Arizona
Series History: Series even 1-1 
Broadcasters: Dave McCann, Blaine Fowler, and Robbie Bullough

Virginia Tech
Series History: BYU leads series 2-0 
Broadcasters: Rich Cellini and Steve Cleveland

Loyola Marymount
Series History: Loyola Marymount leads series 3-2 
Broadcasters: Dave McCann, Blaine Fowler, and Robbie Bullough

at San Francisco
Series History: BYU leads series 7-5 
Broadcasters: Dave McCann and Blaine Fowler (Jarom Jordan and Steve Cleveland Halftime)

Pepperdine
Series History: BYU leads series 6-4 
Broadcasters: Dave McCann, Blaine Fowler, and Robbie Bullough

at Santa Clara
Series History: BYU leads series 17-5
Broadcasters: Barry Tompkins and Brad Holland

Saint Mary's
Series History: BYU leads series 8-4
Broadcasters: Rich Cellini and Miles Simon

San Diego
Series History: BYU leads series 5-0  
Broadcasters: Dave McCann, Steve Cleveland, and Robbie Bullough

at #10 Gonzaga
Series History: Gonzaga leads series 3-2
Broadcasters: Dave Flemming and Stephen Bardo

at Portland
Series History: BYU leads series 7-0 
Broadcasters: Roxy Bernstein and Steve Cleveland

at Pepperdine
Series History: BYU leads series 7-4 
Broadcasters: Ari Wolfe and Jarron Collins

Santa Clara
Series History: BYU leads series 18-5  
Broadcasters: Dave McCann, Steve Cleveland, and Robbie Bullough

at San Diego
Series History: BYU leads series 6-0 
Broadcasters: Dave McCann and Blaine Fowler

San Francisco
Series History: BYU leads series 8-5 
Broadcasters: Dave McCann, Steve Cleveland, and Robbie Bullough

Portland
Series History: BYU leads series 8-0 
Broadcasters: Dave McCann, Steve Cleveland, and Robbie Bullough

Utah State
Series History: BYU leads series 136-92  
Broadcasters: Dave McCann, Blaine Fowler, and Robbie Bullough

This game was originally scheduled for December 5. However, the day before the game, Utah State player Danny Berger collapsed at practice, stopped breathing, and had to be revived. Berger was in critical condition at a hospital in the Salt Lake City suburb of Murray, but quickly improved and was released on December 8. Both schools agreed to postpone and reschedule the game. On the day of Berger's release, the game's new date of February 19 was announced.

at Saint Mary's
Series History: BYU leads series 8-5 
Broadcasters: Kanoa Leahey and Sean Farnham

#2 Gonzaga
Series History: Gonzaga leads series 4-2
Broadcasters: Dave Flemming and Mark Adams

at Loyola Marymount
Series History: Series even 3-3
Broadcasters: Roxy Bernstein and Danny Schayes

WCC Quarterfinals: vs. San Diego 
Series History: BYU leads series 5-1
Broadcasters: Dave Flemming and Sean Farnham

NIT 1st Round: Washington
Series History: Washington leads series 10-8 
Broadcasters: Roxy Bernstein and Sean Farnham

NIT 2nd Round: Mercer 
Series History: First Meeting
Broadcasters: Dave Pasch and Bill Walton

NIT Quarterfinal: at Southern Miss
Series History: First Meeting 
Broadcasters: Dave Neal and Joe Dean, Jr.

NIT Semifinal: Baylor
Series History: BYU leads series 5-4
Broadcasters: Bob Wischusen, Dan Dakich, and Bill Raftery (ESPN2); Brad Sham and Steve Lappas (Dial Global)

Rankings

Post-season Awards
Tyler Haws won the following post-season awards for the 2013-13 season:
 District 9 First Team by the National Association of Basketball Coaches
 First Team All District by the United States Basketball Writers Association
 All-West Coast Conference Team by the league's coaches

Brandon Davies won the following post-season awards for the 2012-13 season:
 District 9 Second Team by the national Association of Basketball Coaches
 First Team All District by the United States Basketball Writers Association
 All-West Coast Conference Team by the league's coaches

References

BYU Cougars men's basketball seasons
BYU
BYU
BYU Cougars men's basketball
BYU Cougars men's basketball